To levende og en død may refer to:

 To levende og en død (novel), a 1931 novel by Sigurd Christiansen 
 To levende og en død (film), a 1937 Norwegian film adaptation
 Two Living, One Dead, a 1961 British-Swedish film adaptation